Valeriu Andrunache (born 27 August 1976) is a Romanian rower. He competed in the men's coxless four event at the 2000 Summer Olympics.

References

1976 births
Living people
Romanian male rowers
Olympic rowers of Romania
Rowers at the 2000 Summer Olympics
People from Galați County